Jake Dan-Azumi is a Nigerian social scientist. He was a Special Assistant to the former President of the Nigerian Senate, Senator David Mark and a Senior Research Fellow at the National Institute for Legislative  and Democratic Studies.

Personal life
Jake Dan-Azumi was born in Damaturu, Yobe state, north east Nigeria. He is of the Mumuye ethnic group in Taraba state. His growing up involved a lot of movement around the north eastern part of Nigeria because his father, Joseph Dan-Azumi who worked for the Federal Bureau of Statistics was transferred to different states.

Education
Dan-Azumi obtained B.A degrees from the University of Zimbabwe and the University of South Africa. He holds a doctorate in Development Planning & Administration from University College London. He also holds a Postgraduate Diploma from the  University of Bradford. Dan-Azumi is a visiting senior lecturer in the Department of Political Science, University of Abuja.

Professional career
Dan-Azumi is currently the head of the International Cooperation Division at the National Institute for Legislative & Democratic Studies in the Nigeria National Assembly  and has served as a faculty member of Loyola Jesuit College. He served as a Special Assistant to the President of the Nigeria Senate between 2011 and 2013. Dan-Azumi has served as a governance consultant with the United Nations Development Program UNDP  where he  worked as an officer for the UNDP/DGD Project on Strengthening Key Processes and Committees of the Nigerian National Assembly. He was the Assistant Coordinator of the NILDS-University of Benin Postgraduate Programme. He has previously worked with the Jesuit Refugee Service in Zambia.

References

Nigerian politicians
Year of birth missing (living people)
Living people